Vaghodia INA is a town and an industrial notified area in Vadodara district in the Indian state of Gujarat.

Demographics
 India census, Vaghodia INA had a population of 961. Males constitute 67% of the population and females 33%. Vaghodia INA has an average literacy rate of 68%, higher than the national average of 59.5%: male literacy is 80%, and female literacy is 44%. In Vaghodia INA, 10% of the population is under 6 years of age.

References

Urban and suburban areas of Vadodara
Cities and towns in Vadodara district